Steve Reiss (born August 28, 1958, in Forest Hills, New York and raised in Manhattan and Bridgehampton, New York) is a Grammy-nominated producer, entrepreneur, author and ocean activist. Reiss specializes in the development of content and intellectual property in short form and long form content, documentary films and special projects. H

Early life 
Reiss began his education in science, studying Marine Science at the University of Miami and Marine Biology at UC San Diego graduating with a degree in Visual Arts.

Entertainment 
Reiss has had a diverse career in entertainment, holding posts at NBC Productions, Propaganda Films and Satellite Films, Digital Domain, Speedshape Los Angeles, Sea Level VFX, and Copa.  Between 1998 and 2008 he worked with Partizan, Anonymous Content, Spot Welders and Speedshape working on advertising campaigns for companies including: the Gap, Lexus Dark Ride, BMW, Nike and Air France. Reiss has worked with top directors Mark Romanek, Peter Care, Michel Gondry, Spike Jonze, Phil Joanou, Michael Bay and has produced music videos for celebrated artists Michael Jackson—who taught him the "moonwalk" during their shoot—The Breeders, and Lauryn Hill.

Reiss was credited as a co-producer for R.E.M.’s Road Movie for Warner Bros. in 1996; and produced and packaged the books “Mark Romanek: Music Video Stills” in 1999 and "Thirty Frames Per Second: The Visionary Art of the Music Video," the following year with writer and editor Neil Feineman.

Activism 
Reiss is a surfer and environmental activist for the preservation of clean water and the oceans. He is a sustainability and partnerships advisor for the Catapulta Fest in Oaxaca, Mexico, a social innovation gathering that promotes impact based entrepreneurship, and has done fundraising and outreach for Heal the Bay.  Reiss is also the strategic advisor for SustainableSurf.org, an organization that seeks to transform surf culture into a powerful community that protects the ocean's resources as it pertains to the surf industry and culture.  e consults for the Buckminster Fuller Institute and is an advisor to the Florence Belsky Charitable Foundation. H

Publications and book packaging

Mark Romanek: Music Video Stills (1999) 
Mark Romanek: Music Video Stills showcases the innovative work of director Mark Romanek and his contributions to the field of music television in beautiful still images.

Thirty Frames Per Second: The Visionary Art of the Music Video (2000) 
Co-written by Reiss and Neil Feineman, a former editor for RayGun Magazine, Thirty Frames Per Second chronicles the history of music videos and its influence on pop culture, sports, advertising and fashion. The book features music video work by influential directors including: Spike Jonze, Peter Care, Kevin Kerslake, Mark Romanek, and David Fincher, and was positively reviewed by LA Weekly. Nearly 400 still shots from music videos are illustrated in the book, which is the first of its kind to convert low resolution frame stills into high resolution digital imagery fit for print.

A + R (2006-2007) 
Collaborated with Writer Neil Feineman, music executive Jeff Anderson and Canadian art director Bill Douglas to develop a collectibles program for fans worldwide of noted bands which included an online portal and print publication.

Leonard Cohen (2015) 
Packaged an art book based on the behind the scenes photography of Sharon Robinson. The book was published by Powerhouse Books and continues to be among its best selling titles. The images illustrated in the book are represented by the Morrison Hotel Gallery.

The Beatles Help (2016) 
A photography book based on the on-set photography of Emilio Lari taken during the 1964 Beatles' "Help" Tour. The images illustrated in this book are represented by the Morrison Hotel Gallery and the book itself has been translated and sold in countries including: Japan, China, Italy and Germany.

Producer credits

Television 
 P.S. I Luv U (1991)
 In a Heartbeat (2000)
 "In Search of Stone" – pilot (2010)

Film and DVD 

 "Cindy Crawford Shape Your Body Workout" – Satellite Films (1992)
 "One West Waikiki" TV Series – CBS Television and Rysher Entertainment (1994)
 "RoadMovie a.k.a. R.E.M.: Road Movie" – Warner Bros Music (1996)
 "Inside Sessions - The Writers Process: from Concept to Publication" (2001)
 "Inside Sessions - The Music Business: An Insider's Guide to Breaking In" (2001)
 "The Work of Director Mark Romanek" – DVD series and documentary (2005)
 "Beloved" – short film (2009)

Music videos 
The Breeders – "Cannonball" (1993)
Michael Jackson – "History Re-Mix" (1997)
Lauryn Hill – "Everything is Everything" (1999)
YouthAIDS and Luxe Media Group and Timbaland – "What More Can I Give" (2003)
Coldplay and Rihanna – "Princess of China" (2012) Executive Producer for Copa

Post-producer and visual effects supervisor credits

Music videos 
 Michael Jackson –  "Jam" & Jam promos (1991) 
 David Bowie  – "Black Tie, White Noise" (1992)
 David Bowie –  "Jump They Say" (1992)
 Madonna  – "Deeper and Deeper" (1992)
 U2  – "Who's Gonna Ride Your Wild Horses" (1992)
 Bruce Hornsby  – "Harbor Lights" (1993)
 Lenny Kravitz  – "Are You Gonna Go My Way" (1993)
 Madonna –  "Rain" (1993)
 Lenny Kravitz –  "Circus" (1995)
 Alanis Morissette –  "Head Over Feet" (1995)
 Paula Abdul  – "Ain't Never Gonna Give You Up" (1996)
 Luscious Jackson –  "Naked Eye" (1996)
 R.E.M. –  "Electrolite" (1996)
 Aerosmith – "Falling in Love is Hard on the Knees" (1997)
 Janet Jackson –  "Together Again" (1997)
 Gloria Estefan –  "Heaven's What I Feel" (1998)

Awards and nominations

Music videos 
 1993 MTV Video Music Awards – Nominated Best Alternative Video – The Breeders: "Cannonball"
 2000 Grammy Awards – Nominated for Best R&B Video – Lauryn Hill: "Everything is Everything"

Commercials 
 1996  New York Festivals Advertising Television Award– PSA Campaign– SF MoMa: Keith Haring Retrospective "Graffiti Dog"
 1993 CFDA Award “Chrome Hearts” directed by Spike Jonze

References

External links  
 http://www.stevereiss.com/bio/ (Website)
 http://sustainablesurf.org/about-us/ (Sustainable Surf)
 http://urbanair.is/ (Urban Air)
 https://www.youtube.com/watch?v=fxvkI9MTQw4 ("Canonball," 1993, performbed by The Breeders and produced by Steve Reiss)
 https://www.youtube.com/watch?v=i3_dOWYHS7I ("Everything is Everything," 1999, performed by Lauryn Hill and produced by Steve Reiss)
 http://creativity-online.com/work/lexus-dark-ride-trailer/20076 (Lexus Dark Ride Trailer, 2010—Produced by Steve Reiss)
 https://vimeo.com/104965292 ("Princess of China," 2012, performed by Coldplay and Rihanna and produced by Steve Reiss)

1958 births
Living people
Film producers from California
Television producers from California
Music video producers
People from New York (state)
Sustainability advocates
University of California, San Diego alumni